Onyl is a rural locality (a settlement) in Serebryanskoye Rural Settlement, Gaynsky District, Perm Krai, Russia. The population was 417 as of 2010. There are 9 streets.

Geography 
Onyl is located 46 km northwest of Gayny (the district's administrative centre) by road. Sosnovaya is the nearest rural locality.

References 

Rural localities in Gaynsky District